Ewout W. Steyerberg (born July 26, 1967) is Professor of Clinical Biostatistics and Medical Decision Making at Leiden University Medical Center and a Professor of Medical Decision Making at Erasmus MC. He is interested in a wide range of statistical methods for medical research, but is mainly known for his seminal work on prediction modeling, which was stimulated by various research grants including a fellowship from the Royal Netherlands Academy of Arts and Sciences (KNAW). Steyerberg is one of the most cited researchers from the Netherlands. He has published over 1000 peer-reviewed articles according to PubMed , many in collaboration with clinical researchers, both in methodological and medical journals. His h-index exceeds 150 according to Google Scholar.

Biography
Steyerberg started his education in medicine at the Medical Faculty of Leiden University in 1985. After obtaining his 'propedeuse' in medicine, he initiated his education in Biomedical Sciences at the same university. In 1991, he received his MSc (cum laude). He started working towards his PhD at the Department of Public Health  of Erasmus MC. His thesis, titled ‘Prognostic Modeling for Clinical Decision Making: Theory and Applications’, was completed in 1996. Subsequently, Steyerberg held a position at Erasmus MC. He spent sabbaticals at Duke University (Durham, NC: 1996) and Harvard University (Boston, MA: 2003 and 2005). In 2006, he was appointed professor at Erasmus MC, where he has been the chair of the Medical Decision Making group till the end of 2016, succeeded by Dr Hester Lingsma. In 2017, Steyerberg was appointed as Chair of the Department of Biomedical Data Sciences at Leiden University Medical Center.

Research findings
Steyerberg's methodological research is mainly focussed on clinical prediction modeling. He has developed and applied advanced regression modeling and related statistical techniques for prediction in many medical domains. Other areas of interest include design and analysis of randomized clinical trials, cost-effectiveness, decision analysis, and quality of care research, all with the aim to make better decisions in health care. Contemporary research themes have his attention, including Comparative effectiveness research, Big data, Machine learning, Value-based Healthcare and Precision medicine.

Medical fields of application include oncology (e.g. testicular, bladder, prostate, esophageal, colorectal, lymphomas, and hereditary cancers); cardiovascular disease (e.g. acute myocardial infarction, heart valve replacement, limb ischemia, primary and secondary prevention of CVD); internal medicine; pediatrics (e.g. triage systems); infectious diseases (e.g. leprosy, chlamydia trachomatis screening); neurology (Guillain Barré syndrome, stroke); and traumatic brain injury (prognosis and efficiency of trial design, comparative effectiveness research, new biomarkers).

Achievements

Steyerberg is known for his tremendous contribution to the field of statistical methods for prediction research. Among his most-cited articles are several methodological papers on the development and validation of clinical prediction models. In 2009, he published a text book ‘Clinical Prediction Models: A Practical Approach to Development, Validation, and Updating’. The book provides insight and practical illustrations on how modern statistical concepts and regression methods can be applied in medical prediction problems, including diagnostic and prognostic outcomes. It has become both a practical guide and reference work for anyone involved in prediction research in medicine. A second edition was published in 2019.

Steyerberg received a fellowship from the Royal Netherlands Academy of Arts and Sciences and the John M. Eisenberg Award for Practical Application of Medical Decision Making Research by the Society for Medical Decision Making in 2016. In 2019 Steyerberg was elected as member of the Royal Netherlands Academy of Arts and Sciences.

Personal life

Steyerberg currently lives in Gouda , near the lakes of Reeuwijk , with his wife, Aleida Steyerberg-Sluijk, a manager, and their three children Matthijs, Laurens, and Suzanne. The Steyerberg family owns a Labrador, named Bas. As an amateur runner, Steyerberg finished three marathons. His personal best, 3:51, was set at the Rotterdam Marathon in 2010. Together with his sons he is interested in cryptocurrency.

References

Living people
1967 births
Academic staff of Erasmus University Rotterdam
Dutch medical researchers
Dutch statisticians
Leiden University alumni
Members of the Royal Netherlands Academy of Arts and Sciences